Something New, is an album by jazz bassist Sam Jones' 12 Piece Band recorded in 1979 and released on the Interplay label.

Reception 

The Allmusic review called it "An excellent jazz orchestra that has been long forgotten since Sam Jones' death in 1981" and states "Many all-stars were in the band".

Track listing 
 "Unit Seven" (Sam Jones) – 8:12
 "Stella by Starlight" (Victor Young, Ned Washington) – 9:05
 "Tropical Delight" (Pete Yellin) – 5:39
 "Antigua" (Bob Mintzer) – 6:06
 "Tender Touch" (Ernie Wilkins) – 5:45

Personnel 
Sam Jones – bass, director
Spanky Davis, John Eckert, Richard Williams – trumpet
Sam Burtis, Dick Griffin – trombone
Ronnie Cuber, Bob Mintzer, Harold Vick, Pete Yellin – reeds
Fred Hersch – piano
Mickey Roker – drums

References 

Sam Jones (musician) albums
1979 albums
Interplay Records albums